Antonina Liedtke, aka Nina, is a Polish science fiction writer and a technical editor.

Life
She became known in Poland with her short story CyberJoly Drim (Fenix, 1(80) 1999). Her other stories include Psychika ofiary (Psychic of the victim, Framzeta 8(2000)).

CyberJoly drim has been awarded with Elektrybałt, Janusz A. Zajdel Award, Srebrny Glob Award, and the On-Line Award from the ezine Fahrenheit The story was extremely popular, despite being initially rejected by Maciej Parowski, the editor-in-chief of Nowa Fantastyka. Some quotes entered Polish internet jargon, e.g. "You can log off, but you can never leave".

She is a graduate of librarianship and information science from the University of Warsaw and worked in the library and publishing house of Warsaw University of Technology, and then the Publishing School of Economics. She is now editorial secretary in the publishing house Runa (Agencja Wydawnicza RUNA), created by an editor and translator Paulina Braiter-Ziemkiewicz, fantasy author Anna Brzezińska, and Edyta Szulc.

References

Polish science fiction writers
Living people
Year of birth missing (living people)
University of Warsaw alumni
Women science fiction and fantasy writers